Stan Van Dessel (born 24 July 2001) is a Belgian football player who plays for Sint-Truiden.

Club career
He made his Belgian First Division A debut for Sint-Truiden on 2 August 2019 in a game against Club Brugge. He started the game and was substituted after 56 minutes.

References

External links
 

2001 births
People from Diest
Living people
Belgian footballers
Belgium youth international footballers
Association football midfielders
Sint-Truidense V.V. players
Belgian Pro League players
Footballers from Flemish Brabant